The Union Hotel is a historic hotel building at 926 Cundy's Harbor Road in the Cundy's Harbor village of Harpswell, Maine.  Built in 1862, it is believed to be the oldest purpose-built summer resort hotel in the state.  It was listed on the National Register of Historic Places in 1985.  It now houses the Captain's Watch Bed and Breakfast.

Description and history
The Union Hotel building stands atop a rise in the village of Cundy's Harbor, located near the southeastern tip of Sebascodegan Island, which forms the eastern part of the town of Harpswell.  The building, which looks like a large house, stands on the west side of Cundy's Harbor Road, just north of the village library.  It is a two-story wood frame structure, with a hip roof and clapboard siding.  The roof is topped at its center by an octagonal cupola.  The building trim is a vernacular Italianate style, with corner pilasters rising to a broad entablature, and deep eaves.  Early photos of the building show that it once had roof balustrades and a porch.

The Union Hotel was built in 1862 by Daniel Weeks Simpson, a native of nearby Brunswick who married into a local family.  It is believed to be the oldest resort hotel building in the state; an earlier instance in Harpswell, built in 1835, was destroyed by fire in 1868.  Simpson's hotel was a financial failure, and the building has seen a variety of uses over the years.  In the 19th century, in addition to several stints as a hotel, it as house a local school and church, and in the 20th century it was converted into a private residence.  It now houses the Captain's Watch, a bed and breakfast inn.

See also
National Register of Historic Places listings in Cumberland County, Maine

References

Commercial buildings on the National Register of Historic Places in Maine
Italianate architecture in Maine
Commercial buildings completed in 1862
National Register of Historic Places in Cumberland County, Maine
Buildings and structures in Harpswell, Maine
1862 establishments in Maine